Becky's Back is a four-episode Korean drama, airing on KBS2 from June 6, 2016, starring Kang Ye-won, Jin Ji-hee, Kim Sung-oh, Choi Dae-chul, In Gyo-jin and Choi Phillip.

Synopsis
Shin Ok-hee, a frequent runaway and borderline delinquent, reluctantly relocates with her parents to their hometown of Seomwoldo, an island in the middle of nowhere. Her mother Yang Baek-hee (Becky) had left her hometown, eighteen year previously, as an unwed mother and under a cloud of scandal, in Seomwoldo Ok-hee discovers that she has more in common with her mother than she knew, and encounters three men all of whom believe themselves to be her biological father. In her attempts to discover her parentage Ok-hee unlocks secrets that allow lives and loves to heal.

Cast
 Kang Ye-won as Yang Baek-hee (Becky)
 Jin Ji-hee as Shin Ok-hee
 Kim Sung-oh as Woo Bum-ryong
 Choi Dae-chul as Cha Jong-myung
 In Gyo-jin as Hong Doo-sik
 Choi Phillip as Shin Ki-joon
 Kim Hyun-sook as Hwang Jang-mi
 Yoo Hae-jung as Hong Bo-reum
 Jo Yang-ja as Jum-rye
 Lee Yong-nyeo as Passenger ship passenger
 Han Tae-il as Villager
 Nam Jung-hee as Villager
 Jo Ryun as Villager 
 Kim Jung-young as Hong Doo-sik's older sister 
 Park Young-soo as Mr. Jung (pork restaurant owner)
 Hong Kyung-yeon as Supermarket owner
 Jeon Bae-soo as Teacher 
 In Sung-ho as Police 
 Kim In-kyung as Nam Joo-ri
 Choi Gyo-sik as Taxi driver 
 Jo Mi-nyeo as Choi Myung-sun
 Lee Jae-wook as Barber 
 Kim Hyun as Neighbor

Ratings
In this table,  represent the lowest ratings and  represent the highest ratings.

Awards and nominations

References

External links
  
 
 

Korean Broadcasting System television dramas
2016 South Korean television series debuts
2016 South Korean television series endings
Korean-language television shows
South Korean comedy television series
Television series by SM Life Design Group